The Sixth Philippine Legislature was the meeting of the legislature of the Philippines under the sovereign control of the United States from 1922 to 1925.

Members

Senate

Notes

House of Representatives

Notes

See also
Congress of the Philippines
Senate of the Philippines
House of Representatives of the Philippines

External links

Further reading
Philippine House of Representatives Congressional Library

06